Tansener Tanpura is a musical mystery Bengali web series. The series is about the notes and melodies of music through the traditional Indian classical music. Directed by Soumik Chattopadhyay and developed in Anandagarh. Pushpita Mukherjee and Debshankar Haldar join in Tansener Tanpura Season 2.

The second season is streamed on 13 November 2020.

Description 
The plot revolves around the travel of a youngster in search of haunting events and the truth. He sets out to Tansener Tanpura filled with the magic of music and a lot of mysteries.

The series features Vikram Chatterjee, Rupsha Chatterjee, Jayati Bhatia, Rajat Ganguly, Debesh Roychowdhury, Sujan Mukherjee, Subhashish Mukherjee, Bhaskar Banerjee in the lead roles.
On 22 June hoichoi released an animated shot that looks back to the story history.

Cast 
Vikram Chatterjee as Alap
Rupsa Chatterjee as Shruti
Jayati Bhatia as Madhubanti Mishra
Rajat Ganguly as Kedar Mishra
Debesh Roychowdhury as Bahadur Hussain 
Neel Mukherjee as Lalit Sen
Subhashish Mukherjee as Ramnidhi Gosain 
Bhaskar Banerjee as Hemanta Ganguly 
Debshankar Haldar as Ranjan Ghosh
Pushpita Mukherjee as Rohini / Raunak Bai
Sourav Saha as the assistant of Ramnidhi Gosain
Kalyan Chatterjee as the beggar
Surajit Bandopadhyay as Sunil Mitra
Angana Roy as young Rohini / young Raunak Bai
Anuradha Mukherjee as young Madhubanti Mishra
Satyam Bhattacharya as young Hemanta Ganguly
Suhotro Mukherjee as young Lalit Sen
Saunak Samanta as young Ramnidhi Gosain
Gautam Siddhartha Ghosh as young Ranjan Ghosh
Pradip Dhar as the grandson of the beggar
Pradip Bhattacharya as Madhubanti Mishra's house servant
Soumyadip Banerjee
Rupam as Chotu
Soumitra Banerjee
Goutam Saha
Anirban Paria
Jagannath Chakraborty

Episodes

Season 1 (2020)
The series started streaming on 26 June 2020 on Bengali OTT platform hoichoi with five episodes. Hoichoi also promised that they will release the rest of the episode soon. On 3 July 2020 hoichoi released all the remaining episodes.

Season 2 (2020)

OST

The original soundtrack is composed by Joy Sarkar with lyrics by Srijato. The OST "Chhonnochhara Mon" has been sung by Somlata Acharyya Chowdhury, Jimut Roy, Soham Chakrabarty.

References

External links

Indian web series
Bengali-language web series
2020 web series debuts
Hoichoi original programming